is an anime television series adapted from the manga of the same name by Adachitoka. It is produced by Bones and directed by Kotaro Tamura with character designs by Toshihiro Kawamoto. The series follows a poor deity named Yato, who desires to become a famous god, and his adventures with a human girl named Hiyori, whose spirit frequently leaves her body, and Yukine, a young wandering spirit whom he adopts as his weapon.

Prior to the series' television premiere, its first episode was screened at 2013's Anime Festival Asia on November 10, 2013. The anime began airing in Japan on January 5, 2014, on Tokyo MX and later on MBS, BS11 and TVA. Funimation licensed the anime for streaming in North America. Madman Entertainment licensed the anime for distribution in Australia and New Zealand.

Two additional episodes were released on DVDs, bundled with the limited edition of the 10th and 11th manga volumes, published on February 17 and July 17, 2014.

The anime's second season, was announced March 2015 by Kodansha. The series aired between October 2, 2015 and December 25, 2015.

List of Episodes

Noragami

Noragami Aragoto

Home media

References

Noragami